Michael Stephen Lehmann (born March 30, 1957) is an American film and television director known for directing the dark comedy Heathers.

Early life and education
In 1978, Lehmann graduated from Columbia University.

Lehmann is of Jewish descent.

Career 
Lehmann's first job in the film industry was answering phones at Francis Ford Coppola's American Zoetrope film company. Later he supervised cameras on films that included 1983's The Outsiders. Lehmann attended film school at the USC School of Cinematic Arts and graduated in 1985. While at USC he made a student film, The Beaver Gets a Boner, the title of which he believes helped get the attention of film executives who would later hire him.

A short film by Lehmann, titled "Ed's Secret Life (An Unauthorized Biography)", was shown on Saturday Night Live. Purportedly about Mister Ed's post-career life, William Schallert, Mick Fleetwood, and Heather Locklear appeared in it.

Lehmann is most known for directing the dark comedy Heathers. He also directed 40 Days and 40 Nights, The Truth About Cats & Dogs, Hudson Hawk, Meet the Applegates, Airheads and Because I Said So.

Lehmann directed his first television commercial through the Leo Burnett Company in June 1996 for McDonald's. Lehmann also directs for television, and has worked on The Comeback and The West Wing. Lehmann directed episodes of The Larry Sanders Show, Watching Ellie, Century City, Big Love, True Blood, Californication, Wonderfalls, White Famous, Betas, American Horror Story, Snowfall, Veronica Mars, and 68 Whiskey.

Lehmann said that he never would make a sequel to Heathers and that Winona Ryder wanted to do Heathers set in Washington, D.C., but he saw no potential for the project.

Partial filmography
 Heathers (1988)
 Meet the Applegates (1990)
 Hudson Hawk (1991)
 Airheads (1994)
 The Truth About Cats & Dogs (1996)
 My Giant (1998)
 40 Days and 40 Nights (2002)
Because I Said So (2007)
 Flakes (2007)

References

External links

1957 births
Living people
American television directors
Columbia College (New York) alumni
USC School of Cinematic Arts alumni
Film directors from San Francisco
Comedy film directors